is a passenger railway station  located in the city of Sanda, Hyōgo Prefecture, Japan. It is operated by the West Japan Railway Company (JR West).

Lines

Station layout
The station consists of two opposed ground-level side platforms. The station building is located on the south side of Platform 1, and is connected to Platform 2 on the opposite side by a footbridge without a roof. There are no elevators or other equipment installed on the overpass, making it difficult for wheelchair users to reach Platform 2. The station is unattended

Platforms

Adjacent stations

History
Dōjō Sation opened on 25 January 1899, as a station of Hankaku Railway, which was nationalized in 1907. With the privatization of the Japan National Railways (JNR) on 1 April 1987, the station came under the aegis of the West Japan Railway Company.

Station numbering was introduced in March 2018 with Dojo being assigned station number JR-G60.

Passenger statistics
In fiscal 2016, the station was used by an average of 998 passengers daily

Surrounding area
 Fuji Titanium Industry Kobe Factory
Senkari Dam

See also
List of railway stations in Japan

References

External links 

 Dōjō Station from JR-Odekake.net 

Railway stations in Hyōgo Prefecture
Railway stations in Japan opened in 1899
Sanda, Hyōgo